Hypochrysops pagenstecheri  is a butterfly of the family Lycaenidae endemic to New Britain. The name honours Arnold Pagenstecher.

References

Luciini